Jamie Davis (born 18 April 1981) is an English actor and writer. He is known for his roles as Harley Lawson in the ITV drama Footballers' Wives (2004–2005) and its spin-off Extra Time (2005), Leon Taylor in the Sky One series Hex (2004–2005), and Max Walker in the BBC medical soap Casualty (2013–2018).

Biography
Davis was born and brought up in Pontefract, West Yorkshire, where he attended Carleton High School. He used to play semi-professional football, and is a self-described supporter of Liverpool F.C. He lives with his wife Lucy and their children, Noah and Mabel. They take residence in both England and Wales, depending on Jamie's filming commitments.

Career
Davis started his acting career at the age of 16, in a production of Kes at the West Yorkshire Playhouse in Leeds. His first professional acting role was as a footballer in Trevor's World of Sport.

Davis auditioned for and won the role of Harley Lawson in Footballers' Wives during his third year at drama school. He portrayed Harley for the whole of the third and fourth series of Footballers' Wives and in two episodes of its spin-off, Footballers' Wives: Extra Time.

Between the third and fourth series of Footballers' Wives, Davis appeared alongside John Malkovich in Colour Me Kubrick (2005) and played Leon Taylor in the first season of Hex. He left Footballers' Wives to reprise the role of Leon in Hex season two.

Davis went on to play Davey in The Sarah Jane Adventures episode "Invasion of the Bane" and Steve Sharpe in The Amazing Mrs Pritchard. He has also appeared in episodes of The Bill, Casualty, Two Pints of Lager and a Packet of Crisps and Shameless. He has also appeared in an episode of the BBC drama Death in Paradise (series 2 episode 8).

From 2013 to January 2018, Jamie played the part of Max Walker in the BBC continuing drama series Casualty. He left the show citing that he wanted to spend more time at home, with his wife and two children. Sunetra Sarker honoured her promise to return for one episode as his onscreen estranged wife, Zoe, for his final episode. In 2021 he played Adam, boyfriend of Kim Marsh's Character Donna in the 4th installment of Kay Mellor's the Syndicate.

Filmography

References

External links
 
Footballers' Wives Official site 
Footballers' Wives: Extra Time Official site

1981 births
Living people
English male television actors
English male film actors
English male stage actors
Actors from Pontefract